Jhon Sichel (born 30 March 1967) is an Ecuadorian weightlifter. He competed in the men's light heavyweight event at the 1988 Summer Olympics.

References

External links
 

1967 births
Living people
Ecuadorian male weightlifters
Olympic weightlifters of Ecuador
Weightlifters at the 1988 Summer Olympics
Place of birth missing (living people)
20th-century Ecuadorian people